Goose River is a  tributary of the Red River of the North in North Dakota. Via the Red River, Lake Winnipeg, and the Nelson River, it is part of the watershed of Hudson Bay. 

The Goose River is crossed by the Northwood Bridge and the Caledonia Bridge, both listed on the National Register of Historic Places.

See also 
 :Category:Bridges over the Goose River (North Dakota)

References

Rivers of North Dakota
Bodies of water of Grand Forks County, North Dakota
Bodies of water of Traill County, North Dakota
Tributaries of Hudson Bay